William Formby Halsall (March 20, 1841  – November 7, 1919) was a marine painter born in Kirkdale, England. His parents were John and Mary.

He lived at Provincetown, Massachusetts and died as a US citizen.

Mariner and fresco painter

Halsall was educated in Boston, Massachusetts and worked as a sailor for seven years from 1852 to 1859. In 1860, he had begun to study fresco painting but due to the outbreak of the American Civil War, he enlisted in the United States Navy. He resumed his fresco study after two years of service.

Marine painting

In 1862, Halsall changed to marine painting and studied at the Lowell Institute in Boston until 1870. Halsall was also a founding member of the Provincetown Art Association in 1914.

He died in Winthrop, Massachusetts on November 7, 1919.

References

External links
 
 

19th-century American painters
American male painters
20th-century American painters
American marine artists
1841 births
1919 deaths
19th-century American male artists
20th-century American male artists